Walmart Inc. (formerly Wal-Mart Stores, Inc.) is an American multinational retail corporation that operates a chain of hypermarkets (also called supercenters), discount department stores, and grocery stores in the United States, headquartered in Bentonville, Arkansas. The company was founded by Sam Walton and James "Bud" Walton in nearby Rogers, Arkansas in 1962 and incorporated under Delaware General Corporation Law on October 31, 1969. It also owns and operates Sam's Club retail warehouses.

 Walmart has 10,586 stores and clubs in 24 countries, operating under 46 different names. The company operates under the name Walmart in the United States and Canada, as Walmart de México y Centroamérica in Mexico and Central America, and as Flipkart Wholesale in India. It has wholly owned operations in Chile, Canada, and South Africa. Since August 2018, Walmart held only a minority stake in Walmart Brasil, which was renamed Grupo Big in August 2019, with 20 percent of the company's shares, and private equity firm Advent International holding 80 percent ownership of the company. They eventually divested their shareholdings in Grupo Big to French retailer Carrefour, in transaction worth  and completed on June 7, 2022.

Walmart is the world's largest company by revenue, with about US$570 billion in annual revenue, according to the Fortune Global 500 list in October 2022. It is also the largest private employer in the world with 2.2 million employees. It is a publicly traded family-owned business, as the company is controlled by the Walton family. Sam Walton's heirs own over 50 percent of Walmart through both their holding company Walton Enterprises and their individual holdings. Walmart was the largest United States grocery retailer in 2019, and 65 percent of Walmart's  sales came from U.S. operations.

Walmart was listed on the New York Stock Exchange in 1972. By 1988, it was the most profitable retailer in the U.S., and it had become the largest in terms of revenue by October 1989. The company was originally geographically limited to the South and lower Midwest, but it had stores from coast to coast by the early 1990s. Sam's Club opened in New Jersey in November 1989, and the first California outlet opened in Lancaster, in July 1990. A Walmart in York, Pennsylvania, opened in October 1990, the first main store in the Northeast.

Walmart's investments outside the U.S. have seen mixed results. Its operations and subsidiaries in Canada, the United Kingdom (ASDA), Central America, South America, and China are successful, but its ventures failed in Germany, Japan, and South Korea.

History

1945–1969: Early history

In 1945, businessman and former J. C. Penney employee Sam Walton bought a branch of the Ben Franklin stores from the Butler Brothers. His primary focus was selling products at low prices to get higher-volume sales at a lower profit margin, portraying it as a crusade for the consumer. He experienced setbacks because the lease price and branch purchase were unusually high, but he was able to find lower-cost suppliers than those used by other stores and was consequently able to undercut his competitors on pricing. Within the fifth year, the store was generating $250,000 in revenue. The lease then expired for the location and Walton was unable to reach an agreement for renewal, so he opened up a new store at 105 N. Main Street in Bentonville, naming it "Walton's Five and Dime". That store is now the Walmart Museum.

On July 2, 1962, Walton opened the first Wal-Mart Discount City store at 719 W. Walnut Street in Rogers, Arkansas. Its design was inspired by Ann & Hope, which Walton visited in 1961, as did Kmart founder Harry B. Cunningham. The name came from FedMart, a chain of discount department stores founded by Sol Price in 1954, whom Walton was also inspired by. Walton stated that he liked the idea of calling his discount chain "Wal-Mart" because he "really liked Sol's FedMart name". The building is now occupied by a hardware store and an antiques mall, while the company's "Store #1" has since expanded to a Supercenter several blocks west at 2110 W. Walnut Street. Within its first five years, the company expanded to 18 stores in Arkansas and reached $9 million in sales. In 1968, it opened its first stores outside Arkansas in Sikeston, Missouri and Claremore, Oklahoma.

1969–1990: Incorporation and growth as a regional power

The company was incorporated as Wal-Mart, Inc. on October 31, 1969, and changed its name to Wal-Mart Stores, Inc. in 1970. The same year, the company opened a home office and first distribution center in Bentonville, Arkansas. It had 38 stores operating with 1,500 employees and sales of $44.2 million. It began trading stock as a publicly held company on October 1, 1970, and was soon listed on the New York Stock Exchange. The first stock split occurred in May 1971 at a price of $47 per share. By this time, Walmart was operating in five states: Arkansas, Kansas, Louisiana, Missouri, and Oklahoma; it entered Tennessee in 1973 and Kentucky and Mississippi in 1974. As the company moved into Texas in 1975, there were 125 stores with 7,500 employees and total sales of $340.3 million.

In the 1980s, Walmart briefly experimented with a precursor to the Supercenter, the Hyper-Mart.  Four stores combined features of discount stores, supermarkets, pharmacies, video arcades and other amenities.  Walmart continued to grow rapidly, and by the company's 25th anniversary in 1987, there were 1,198 Walmart stores with sales of $15.9  billion and 200,000 associates.  One reason for Walmart's success between 1980 and 2000 is believed to be its contiguous pattern of expansion over time, building new distribution centers in a hub and spoke framework within driving distance of existing Supercenters.

1987 also marked the completion of the company's satellite network, a $24 million investment linking all stores with two-way voice and data transmissions and one-way video communications with the Bentonville office. At the time, the company was the largest private satellite network, allowing the corporate office to track inventory and sales and to instantly communicate to stores. By 1984, Sam Walton had begun to source between 6% and 40% of his company's products from China. In 1988, Walton stepped down as CEO and was replaced by David Glass. Walton remained as chairman of the board. During this year, the first Walmart Supercenter opened in Washington, MO.

With the contribution of its superstores, the company surpassed Toys "R" Us in toy sales in 1998.

1990–2005: Retail rise to multinational status

While it was the third-largest retailer in the United States, Walmart was more profitable than rivals Kmart and Sears by the late 1980s. By 1990, it became the largest U.S. retailer by revenue.

Prior to the summer of 1990, Walmart had no presence on the West Coast or in the Northeast (except for a single Sam's Club in New Jersey which opened in November 1989), but in July and October that year, it opened its first stores in California and Pennsylvania, respectively. By the mid-1990s, it was the most powerful retailer in the U.S. and expanded into Mexico in 1991 and Canada in 1994. Walmart stores opened throughout the rest of the U.S., with Vermont being the last state to get a store in 1995.

In 1997, Walmart was added to the Dow Jones Industrial Average.

In 1998, Walmart introduced the Neighborhood Market concept with three stores in Arkansas. By 2005, estimates indicate that the company controlled about 20 percent of the retail grocery and consumables business.

In 2000, H. Lee Scott became Walmart's president and CEO as the company's sales increased to $165 billion. In 2002, it was listed for the first time as America's largest corporation on the Fortune 500 list, with revenues of $219.8 billion and profits of $6.7 billion. It has remained there every year except 2006, 2009, and 2012.

In 2005, Walmart reported  in sales, more than 6,200 facilities around the world—including 3,800 stores in the United States and 2,800 elsewhere, employing more than 1.6 million associates.

As Walmart expanded rapidly into the world's largest corporation, many critics worried about its effect on local communities, particularly small towns with many "mom and pop" stores. There have been several studies on the economic impact of Walmart on small towns and local businesses, jobs, and taxpayers. In one, Kenneth Stone, a professor of economics at Iowa State University, found that some small towns can lose almost half of their retail trade within ten years of a Walmart store opening. However, in another study, he compared the changes to what small-town shops had faced in the past—including the development of the railroads, the advent of the Sears Roebuck catalog, and the arrival of shopping malls—and concluded that shop owners who adapt to changes in the retail market can thrive after Walmart arrives. A later study in collaboration with Mississippi State University showed that there are "both positive and negative impacts on existing stores in the area where the new supercenter locates."

In the aftermath of Hurricane Katrina in September 2005, Walmart used its logistics network to organize a rapid response to the disaster, donating $20 million, 1,500 truckloads of merchandise, food for 100,000 meals, and the promise of a job for every one of its displaced workers. An independent study by Steven Horwitz of St. Lawrence University found that Walmart, The Home Depot, and Lowe's made use of their local knowledge about supply chains, infrastructure, decision makers and other resources to provide emergency supplies and reopen stores well before the Federal Emergency Management Agency (FEMA) began its response. While the company was overall lauded for its quick response amidst criticism of FEMA, several critics were quick to point out that there still remained issues with the company's labor relations.

In 2006, Charles Fishman published The Wal-Mart Effect, examining the operation of Walmart's supply chain. His book caught the attention of the press and the public. Fishman's case studies illustrate Walmart's drive to lower costs and achieve greater efficiency and suggest that it may have significant upstream effects. Since FIshman's book was published, Walmart has more than doubled in size. Further research on Walmart's role in the food supply chain has tended to be limited and anecdotal.

2005–2010: Initiatives

Environmental initiatives
In November 2005, Walmart announced several environmental measures to increase energy efficiency and improve its overall environmental record, which had previously been lacking. The company's primary goals included spending $500 million a year to increase fuel efficiency in Walmart's truck fleet by 25 percent over three years and double it within ten; reduce greenhouse gas emissions by 20 percent in seven years; reduce energy use at stores by 30 percent; and cut solid waste from U.S. stores and Sam's Clubs by 25 percent in three years. CEO Lee Scott said that Walmart's goal was to be a "good steward of the environment" and ultimately use only renewable energy sources and produce zero waste. The company also designed three new experimental stores with wind turbines, photovoltaic solar panels, biofuel-capable boilers, water-cooled refrigerators, and xeriscape gardens. In this time, Walmart also became the biggest seller of organic milk and the biggest buyer of organic cotton in the world, while reducing packaging and energy costs. In 2007, the company worked with outside consultants to discover its total environmental impact and find areas for improvement. Walmart created its own electric company in Texas, Texas Retail Energy, planned to supply its stores with cheap power purchased at wholesale prices. Through this new venture, the company expected to save $15 million annually and also to lay the groundwork and infrastructure to sell electricity to Texas consumers in the future.

Branding and store design changes
In 2006, Walmart announced that it would remodel its U.S. stores to help it appeal to a wider variety of demographics, including more affluent shoppers. As part of the initiative, the company launched a new store in Plano, Texas, that included high-end electronics, jewelry, expensive wines and a sushi bar.

On September 12, 2007, Walmart introduced new advertising with the slogan, "Save money. Live better.", replacing "Always Low Prices, Always", which it had used since 1988. Global Insight, which conducted the research that supported the ads, found that Walmart's price level reduction resulted in savings for consumers of $287 billion in 2006, which equated to $957 per person or $2,500 per household (up 7.3 percent from the 2004 savings estimate of $2,329).

On June 30, 2008, Walmart removed the hyphen from its logo and replaced the star with a Spark symbol that resembles a sunburst, flower, or star. The new logo received mixed reviews from design critics who questioned whether the new logo was as bold as those of competitors, such as the Target bullseye, or as instantly recognizable as the previous company logo, which was used for 18 years. The new logo made its debut on the company's website on July 1, 2008, and its U.S. locations updated store logos in the fall of 2008. Walmart Canada started to adopt the logo for its stores in early 2009.

Acquisitions and employee benefits
On March 20, 2009, Walmart announced that it was paying a combined  in bonuses to every full and part-time hourly worker. This was in addition to $788.8 million in profit sharing, 401(k) pension contributions, hundreds of millions of dollars in merchandise discounts, and contributions to the employees' stock purchase plan. While the economy at large was in an ongoing recession, Walmart reported solid financial figures for the fiscal year ending January 31, 2009, with $401.2 billion in net sales, a gain of 7.2 percent from the prior year. Income from continuing operations increased 3 percent to $13.3 billion, and earnings per share rose 6 percent to $3.35.

On February 22, 2010, the company confirmed it was acquiring video streaming company Vudu, Inc. for an estimated $100 million.

In May 2021, Walmart acquired the Israeli startup Zeekit startup for $200 million. Zeekit uses artificial intelligence to allow customers to try on clothing via a dynamic virtual platform.

2011–2019
Walmart's truck fleet logs millions of miles each year, and the company planned to double the fleet's efficiency between 2005 and 2015. The truck pictured is one of 15 based at Walmart's Buckeye, Arizona, distribution center that was converted to run on biofuel from reclaimed cooking grease made during food preparation at Walmart stores.
Studies of food choice, dietary quality, and health have found that Supercenters in the United States are associated with increases in obesity rates and average body mass, and that shoppers at Walmart do not follow Dietary Guidelines for Americans as well as shoppers at traditional supermarkets.
In January 2011, Walmart announced a program to improve the nutritional value of its store brands over five years, reduce prices for whole foods and vegetables, and open stores in low-income areas, so-called "food deserts", where there are no supermarkets.  Subsequent research is limited. Walmart may increase food access and decrease food instability, but it does not appear to increase dietary quality.

On April 23, 2011, the company announced that it was testing its new "Walmart To Go" home delivery system where customers will be able to order specific items offered on their website. The initial test was in San Jose, California, and the company has not yet said whether the delivery system will be rolled out nationwide.

On November 14, 2012, Walmart launched its first mail subscription service called Goodies. Customers pay a $7 monthly subscription for five to eight delivered food samples each month, so they can try new foods. The service shut down in late 2013.

In August 2013, the firm announced it was in talks to acquire a majority stake in the Kenya-based supermarket chain, Naivas.

In June 2014, some Walmart employees went on strike in major U.S. cities demanding higher wages. In July 2014, American actor and comedian Tracy Morgan launched a lawsuit against Walmart seeking punitive damages over a multi-car pile-up which the suit alleges was caused by the driver of one of the firm's tractor-trailers who had not slept for 24 hours. Morgan's limousine was apparently hit by the trailer, injuring him and two fellow passengers and killing a fourth, fellow comedian James McNair. Walmart settled with the McNair family for $10 million, while admitting no liability. Morgan and Walmart reached a settlement in 2015 for an undisclosed amount, though Walmart later accused its insurers of "bad faith" in refusing to pay the settlement.

In 2015, the company closed five stores on short notice for plumbing repairs. However, employees and the United Food and Commercial Workers International Union (UFCW) alleged some stores were closed in retaliation for strikes aimed at increasing wages and improving working conditions. The UFCW filed a complaint with the National Labor Relations Board. All five stores have since reopened.

In 2015, Walmart was the biggest US commercial producer of solar power with 142 MW capacity, and had 17 energy storage projects. This solar was primarily on rooftops, whereas there is an additional 20,000 m2 for solar canopies over parking lots.

On January 15, 2016, Walmart announced it would close 269 stores in 2016, affecting 16,000 workers. One hundred and fifty-four of these stores earmarked for closure were in the U.S. (150 Walmart U.S. stores, 115 Walmart International stores, and 4 Sam's Clubs). Ninety-five percent of these U.S. stores were located, on average, 10 miles from another Walmart store. The 269 stores represented less than 1 percent of global square footage and revenue for the company. The 102 locations of Neighborhood Markets that were formerly or originally planned to be Walmart Express, which had been in a pilot program since 2011 and converted in to Neighborhood Markets in 2014, were included in the closures. Walmart planned to focus on "strengthening Supercenters, optimizing Neighborhood Markets, growing the e-commerce business and expanding pickup services for customers". In fiscal 2017, the company plans to open between 50 and 60 Supercenters, 85 to 95 Neighborhood Markets, 7 to 10 Sam's Clubs, and 200 to 240 international locations. At the end of fiscal 2017, Walmart opened 38 Supercenters and relocated, expanded or converted 21 discount stores into Supercenters, for a total of 59 Supercenters, and opened 69 Neighborhood Markets, 8 Sam's Clubs, and 173 international locations, and relocated, expanded or converted 4 locations for a total of 177 international locations. On August 8, 2016, Walmart announced a deal to acquire e-commerce website Jet.com for US$3.3 billion. Jet.com co-founder and CEO Marc Lore stayed on to run Jet.com in addition to Walmart's existing U.S. e-commerce operation. The acquisition was structured as a payout of $3 billion in cash, and an additional $300 million in Walmart stock vested over time as part of an incentive bonus plan for Jet.com executives. On October 19, 2016, Walmart announced it would partner with IBM and Tsinghua University to track the pork supply chain in China using blockchain. The use of blockchain to automate the tracking of the supply chain promises the potential for Walmart to save money and thus increase profits.

On February 15, 2017, Walmart announced the acquisition of Moosejaw, a leading online active outdoor retailer, for approximately $51 million. The acquisition closed on February 13, 2017. On June 16, 2017, Walmart agreed to acquire the men's apparel company Bonobos for $310 million in an effort to expand its fashion holdings. On September 29, 2017, Walmart acquired Parcel, a technology-based, same-day and last-mile delivery company in Brooklyn. In 2018, Walmart started crowdsourcing delivery services to customers using drivers' private vehicles, under the brand "Spark".

On December 6, 2017, Walmart announced that it would change its corporate name to Walmart Inc. from Wal-Mart Stores, Inc. effective February 1, 2018.

On January 11, 2018, Walmart announced that 63 Sam's Club locations in cities including Memphis, Houston, Seattle, and others would be closing. Some of the stores had already liquidated, without notifying employees; some employees learned by a company-wide email delivered January 11. All of the 63 stores were gone from the Sam's Club website as of the morning of January 11. Walmart said that ten of the stores will become e-commerce distribution centers and employees can reapply to work at those locations. Business Insider magazine calculated that over 11,000 workers will be affected. On the same day, Walmart announced that as a result of the new tax law, it would be raising Walmart starting wages, distributing bonuses, expanding its leave policies and contributing toward the cost of employees' adoptions. Doug McMillon, Walmart's CEO, said, "We are early in the stages of assessing the opportunities tax reform creates for us to invest in our customers and associates and to further strengthen our business, all of which should benefit our shareholders."

In March 2018, Walmart announced that it is producing its own brand of meal kits in all of its stores that is priced under Blue Apron designed to serve two people.

It was reported that Walmart is now looking at entering the subscription-video space, hoping to compete with Netflix and Amazon. They have enlisted the help of former Epix CEO, Mark Greenberg, to help develop a low-cost subscription video-streaming service.

In September 2018, Walmart partnered with comedian and talk show host Ellen DeGeneres to launch a new brand of women's apparel and accessories called EV1.

On February 26, 2019, Walmart announced that it had acquired Tel Aviv-based product review start-up Aspectiva for an undisclosed sum.

In May 2019, Walmart announced the launch of free one-day shipping on more than 220,000 items with minimum purchase amount of $35. The initiative first launched in Las Vegas and the Phoenix area.

In September 2019, Walmart made the announcement that it would cease the sale of all e-cigarettes due to "regulatory complexity and uncertainty" over the products. Earlier in 2019, Walmart stopped selling fruit-flavored e-cigarette and had raised the minimum age to 21 for the purchase of products containing tobacco. That same month, Walmart opened its first Health Center, a "medical mall" where customers can purchase primary care services, such as vision tests, dental exams and root canals, lab work, X-rays and EKGs, counseling, and fitness and diet classes. Prices without insurance were listed, for instance, at $30 for an annual physical and $45 for a counseling session. Continuing with its health care initiative, they opened a  health and wellness clinic prototype in Springdale, Arkansas just to expand services.

As of October 2019, Walmart stopped selling all live fish and aquatic plants.

2020s: Continuing growth and development

This decade, as with many other companies, started off very unorthodox and unusual, due to the large part of the coronavirus (COVID-19) pandemic, including store closures, limited store occupancy, and employment, along with social distancing protocols. The store hours were adjusted to allow cleaning and stocking.

In March 2020, due to the pandemic, Walmart changed some of its employee benefits. Employees can now decide to stay home and take unpaid leave if they feel unable to work or uncomfortable coming to work. Additionally, Walmart employees who contract the virus will receive "up to two weeks of pay". After two weeks, hourly associates who are unable to return to work are eligible for up to 26 weeks in pay. As of July 21, 2020, Walmart paid pandemic bonuses of $428 million to staff.  People who did part-time or temporary work received a bonus of $150 while those who worked full-time received a bonus of $300. In July 2020, Walmart announced that all customers would be required to wear masks in all stores nationwide, including Sam's Club.

In the first quarter of 2020, consumers responded to COVID by shopping less frequently (5.6% fewer transactions), and buying  more when they did shop (16.5%). As people shifted from eating out to eating at home, net sales at Walmart increased by 10.5%, while online sales rose by 74%. Although Walmart experienced a 5.5% increase in operating expenses, its net income increased by 3.9%. In the third quarter of 2020, ending October 31, Walmart reported revenue of $134.7 billion, representing a year-on-year increase of 5.2 percent.

In December 2020, Walmart launched a new service, Carrier Pickup, that allows the customers to schedule a return for a product bought online, in-store, or from a third-party vendor. These services can be initiated on the Walmart App or on the website.

In January 2021, Walmart announced that the company is launching a fintech startup, with venture partner Ribbit Capital, to provide financial products for consumers and employees.

In February 2021, Walmart acquired technology from Thunder Industries, which uses automation to create digital ads, to expand its online marketing capabilities.

In August 2021, Walmart announced it would open its Spark crowdsource delivery to other businesses as a white-label service, competing with Postmates and online food ordering delivery companies.

In December 2021, Walmart announced it will participate in the Stephens Investment Conference Wednesday, and the Morgan Stanley Virtual Global Consumer & Retail Conference. In June 2022, Walmart announced it would be acquiring Memomi, an AR optical tech company.

In August 2022, Walmart announced it would be acquiring Volt Systems, a vendor management and product tracking software company. Walmart announced it was partnering with Paramount to offer Paramount+ content
to its Walmart+ subscribers in a bid to better compete with Amazon.

Walmart announced in August 2022 that locations were not going back to 24 hours with most stores now being open between 6am and 11pm.

In January 2023, Walmart announced it would raise its minimum wage for U.S. hourly workers from $12 to $14 an hour. Approximately 340,000 employees are expected to receive a raise, effective in early March 2023, and Walmart's U.S. average wage is expected to be over $17.50. The company also announced it would be adding additional college degrees and certificates to its Live Better U program.

In February 2023, Walmart announced that they had made $611.3 billion in sales in the previous financial year, up 6.7%, which included a bump in the fourth quarter of the year, which saw $164 billion in sales. Profits for the company were also up, almost doubled from the previous year.

Operating divisions 

As of 2016, Walmart's operations are organized into four divisions: Walmart U.S., Walmart International, Sam's Club and Global eCommerce. In the United States, Walmart's stores operate in four formats: discount, Supercenters.  Neighborhood Markets, and Sam's Club stores. Walmart International stores include additional formats such as supermarkets, hypermarkets, cash-and-carry stores, home improvement, specialty electronics, restaurants, apparel stores, drugstores, and convenience stores.

Walmart U.S. 

It consists of three retail formats that have become commonplace in the United States: Supercenters, Discount Stores, Neighborhood Markets, and other small formats. The discount stores sell a variety of mostly non-grocery products, though emphasis has now shifted towards supercenters, which include more groceries.  there are a total of 4,720 Walmart U.S. stores. In the United States, 90 percent of the population resides within 10 miles of a Walmart store. The total number of Walmart U.S. stores and Sam's Clubs combined is 5,320.

The president and CEO of Walmart U.S. is John Furner.

Walmart Supercenter 

These stock general merchandise and a full-service supermarket, including meat and poultry, baked goods, delicatessen, frozen foods, dairy products, garden produce, and fresh seafood. Many Walmart Supercenters also have a garden center, pet shop, pharmacy, Tire & Lube Express, optical center, one-hour photo processing lab, portrait studio, and numerous alcove shops, such as cellular phone stores, hair and nail salons, video rental stores, local bank branches (such as Woodforest National Bank branches in newer locations), and fast food outlets.

Many Walmart Supercenters currently feature McDonald's or Subway restaurants.  In some Canadian locations, Tim Hortons were opened. Recently, in several Supercenters, like the Tallahassee, Florida and the Palm Desert, California locations, Walmart added Burger King to their locations, and the location in Glen Burnie, Maryland, due to its past as a hypermarket called Leedmark, which operated from May 1991 to January 1994, boasts an Auntie Anne's and an Italian restaurant. Some Walmart's in Canada have Axess Law locations, Mary Browns, Burger King's and alot have McDonald's Restaurants and in Atlantic Canada some Stores have ALC Locations  and Some US locations have Domino's Pizza, and Claires Stores,  Taco Bells and Wendy's, some US Locations have Small arcade's called GamePlay, 

Some locations also have fuel stations which sell gasoline distributed by Murphy USA (which spun off from Murphy Oil in 2013), Sunoco, Inc. ("Optima"), the Tesoro Corporation ("Mirastar"), USA Gasoline, and even now Walmart-branded gas stations.

The first Supercenter opened in Washington, Missouri, in 1988. A similar concept, Hypermart USA, had opened a year earlier in Garland, Texas. All Hypermart USA stores were later closed or converted into Supercenters.

 there were 3,572 Walmart Supercenters in 49 of the 50 U.S. states, the District of Columbia, and Puerto Rico. Hawaii is the only state to not have a Supercenter location. The largest Supercenter in the world, covering  on two floors, is located in Crossgates Commons in Albany, New York.

A typical supercenter sells approximately 120,000 items, compared to the 35 million products sold in Walmart's online store.

The "Supercenter" name has since been phased out, with these stores now simply referred to as "Walmart", since the company introduced the new Walmart logo in 2008. However, the branding is still used in Walmart's Canadian stores (spelled as "Supercentre" in Canadian English).

Walmart Discount Store 

They carry general merchandise and limited groceries. Some newer and remodeled discount stores have an expanded grocery department, similar to Target's PFresh department. Many of these stores also feature a garden center, pharmacy, Tire & Lube Express, optical center, one-hour photo processing lab, portrait studio, a bank branch, a cell phone store, and a fast food outlet. Some also have gasoline stations. Discount Stores were Walmart's original concept, though they have since been surpassed by Supercenters.

In 1990, Walmart opened its first Bud's Discount City location in Bentonville. Bud's operated as a closeout store, much like Big Lots. Many locations were opened to fulfill leases in shopping centers as Walmart stores left and moved into newly built Supercenters. All of the Bud's Discount City stores had closed or converted into Walmart Discount Stores by 1997.

At its peak in 1996, there were 1,995 Walmart Discount Stores, but as of October 31, 2022, that number was dropped to 365.

Walmart Neighborhood Market 

The first Walmart Neighborhood Market opened ten years after the first Supercenter opened, but Walmart did not focus on the smaller grocery store format until the 2010s.

The stores focus on three of Walmart's major sales categories: groceries, which account for about 55 percent of the company's revenue, pharmacy, and, at some stores, fuel. For groceries and consumables, the stores sell fresh produce, deli and bakery items, prepared foods, meat, dairy, organic, general grocery and frozen foods, in addition to cleaning products and pet supplies. Some stores offer wine and beer sales and drive-through pharmacies. Some stores, such as one at Midtown Center in Bentonville, Arkansas, offer made-to-order pizza with a seating area for eating. Customers can also use Walmart's site-to-store operation and pick up online orders at Walmart Neighborhood Market stores just like the Supercenters and Discount Stores

Products at Walmart Neighborhood Market stores have the same prices as those at Walmart's larger supercenters. A Moody's analyst said the wider company's pricing structure gives the chain of grocery stores a "competitive advantage" over competitors Whole Foods, Kroger and Trader Joe's.

Neighborhood Market stores expanded slowly at first as a way to fill gaps between Walmart Supercenters and Discount Stores in existing markets. In its first 12 years, the company opened about 180 Walmart Neighborhood Markets. By 2010, Walmart said it was ready to accelerate its expansion plans for the grocery stores.  there were 682 Walmart Neighborhood Markets, each employing between 90 and 95 full-time and part-time workers. The total number of Neighborhood Markets and other small formats combined is 783.

Depending on the area, Neighborhood Market has some competition with Hy-Vee Fast & Fresh, which launched in 2019, similar to Neighborhood Market.

Former stores and concepts 

Walmart opened Supermercado de Walmart locations to appeal to Hispanic communities in the United States. The first one, a  store in the Spring Branch area of Houston, opened on April 29, 2009. The store was a conversion of an existing Walmart Neighborhood Market. In 2009, another Supermercado de Walmart opened in Phoenix, Arizona. Both locations closed in 2014. In 2009, Walmart opened "Mas Club", a warehouse retail operation patterned after Sam's Club. Its lone store also closed in 2014.

Walmart Express was a chain of smaller discount stores with a range of services from groceries to check cashing and gasoline service. The concept was focused on small towns deemed unable to support a larger store and large cities where space was at a premium. Walmart planned to build 15 to 20 Walmart Express stores, focusing on Arkansas, North Carolina, and Chicago, by the end of its fiscal year in January 2012.  Walmart re-branded all 22 of its Express format stores to Neighborhood Markets in an effort to streamline its retail offer. It continued to open new Express stores under the Neighborhood Market name.  there were 101 small-format stores in the United States. These include 92 other small formats, 8 convenience stores and 1 pickup location. On January 15, 2016, Walmart announced that it would be closing 269 stores globally, including the 102 Neighborhood Markets that were formerly or originally planned to be Express stores.

Between 2002 and 2022, Walmart owned the Amigo supermarkets chain in Puerto Rico. In 2022, Walmart announced that it would sell its Amigo stores to Pueblo Inc. and focus on modernizing its 18 Supercenter and Division 1 formats and 7 Sam's Clubs stores.

Initiatives 
In September 2006, Walmart announced a pilot program to sell generic drugs at $4 per prescription. The program was launched at stores in the Tampa, Florida, area, and by January 2007 had been expanded to all stores in Florida. While the average price of generics is $29 per prescription, compared to $102 for name-brand drugs, Walmart maintains that it is not selling at a loss, or providing them as an act of charity—instead, they are using the same mechanisms of mass distribution that it uses to bring lower prices to other products. Many of Walmart's low cost generics are imported from India, where they are made by drug makers that include Ranbaxy and Cipla.

On February 6, 2007, the company launched a "beta" version of a movie download service, which sold about 3,000 films and television episodes from all major studios and television networks. The service was discontinued on December 21, 2007, due to low sales.

In 2008, Walmart started a pilot program in the small grocery store concept called Marketside in the metropolitan Phoenix, Arizona, area. The four stores closed in 2011.

In 2015, Walmart began testing a free grocery pickup service, allowing customers to select products online and choose their pickup time. At the store, a Walmart employee loads the groceries into the customer's car.  the service is available in 39 U.S. states.

In May 2016, Walmart announced a change to ShippingPass, its three-day shipping service, and that it will move from a three-day delivery to two-day delivery to remain competitive with Amazon. Walmart priced it at 49 dollars per year, compared to Amazon Prime's 99-dollar-per-year price.

In June 2016, Walmart and Sam's Club announced that they would begin testing a last-mile grocery delivery that used services including Uber, Lyft, and Deliv, to bring customers' orders to their homes. Walmart customers would be able to shop using the company's online grocery service at grocery.walmart.com, then request delivery at checkout for a small fee. The first tests were planned to go live in Denver and Phoenix. Walmart announced on March 14, 2018, that it would expand online delivery to 100 metropolitan regions in the United States, the equivalent of 40 percent of households, by the end of the year of 2018.

Walmart's Winemakers Selection private label wine was introduced in June 2018 in about 1,100 stores. The wine, from domestic and international sources, was described by Washington Post food and wine columnist Dave McIntyre as notably good for the inexpensive ($11 to $16 per bottle) price level.

In October 2019, Walmart announced that customers in 2,000 locations in 29 states can use the grocery pickup service for their adult beverage purchases. Walmart will also deliver adult beverages from nearly 200 stores across California and Florida.

In February 2020, Walmart announced a new membership program called, "Walmart +". The news came shortly after Walmart announced the discontinuation of its personal shopping service, Jetblack.

Numbers of stores by state
Locations as of October 1, 2022

Walmart International 

 Walmart's international operations comprised 5,266 stores and 800,000 workers in 23 countries outside the United States. There are wholly owned operations in Argentina, Brazil, Canada, and the UK. With 2.2 million employees worldwide, the company is the largest private employer in the U.S. and Mexico, and one of the largest in Canada. Judith McKenna is the president and CEO of Walmart International .

Central America 
Walmart also owns 51 percent of the Central American Retail Holding Company (CARHCO), which,  consists of 868 stores, including 263 stores in Guatemala (under the Paiz [27 locations], Walmart Supercenter [10 locations], Despensa Familiar [181 locations], and Maxi Dispensa [45 locations] banners), 102 stores in El Salvador (under the Despensa Familiar [63 locations], La Despensa de Don Juan [17 locations], Walmart Supercenter [6 locations], and Maxi Despensa [16 locations] banners), 111 stores in Honduras (including the Paiz [8 locations], Walmart Supercenter [4 locations], Dispensa Familiar [71 locations], and Maxi Despensa [28 locations] banners), 102 stores in Nicaragua (including the Pali [71 locations], La Unión [9 locations], Maxi Pali [20 locations], and Walmart Supercenter [2 locations] banners), and 290 stores in Costa Rica (including the Maxi Pali [49 locations], Mas X Menos [38 locations], Walmart Supercenter [14 locations], and Pali [189 locations] banners).

Chile 

In January 2009, the company acquired a controlling interest in the largest grocer in Chile, Distribución y Servicio D&S SA. In 2010, the company was renamed Walmart Chile.  Walmart Chile operates 384 stores under the banners Lider Hiper (97 locations), Lider Express (154 locations), Superbodega Acuenta (122 locations), and Central Mayorista (11 locations).

Mexico 

Walmart opened its first international store in Mexico in 1991.
 Walmart's Mexico division, the largest outside the U.S., consisted of 2,804 stores. Walmart in Mexico operates Walmart Supercenter (300 locations), Sam's Club (167 locations), Bodega Aurrera (571 locations), Mi Bodega Aurrera (438 locations), Bodega Aurrera Express (1,229 locations) and Walmart Express (99 locations).

Canada 

Walmart has operated in Canada since it acquired 122 stores comprising the Woolco division of Woolworth Canada, Inc on January 14, 1994.  it operates 402 locations (including 343 supercentres and 59 discount stores) and,  it employs 89,358 people, with a local home office in Mississauga, Ontario. Walmart Canada's first three Supercentres (spelled in Canadian English) opened in November 2006 in Ancaster, London, and Stouffville, Ontario. The 100th Canadian Supercentre opened in July 2010, in Victoria, British Columbia.

In 2010, approximately one year after its incorporation of Schedule 2 (foreign-owned, deposit-taking) of Canada's Bank Act, Walmart Canada Bank was introduced with the launch of the Walmart (Canada) Rewards MasterCard. Less than ten years later, however, on May 17, 2018, Wal-Mart Canada announced it had reached a definitive agreement to sell Wal-Mart Canada Bank to First National co-founder Stephen Smith and private equity firm Centerbridge Partners, L.P., on undisclosed financial terms, though it added that it would still be issuer of the Walmart (Canada) Rewards MasterCard.

On April 1, 2019, Centerbridge Partners, L.P. and Stephen Smith jointly announced the closing of the previously announced acquisition of Wal-Mart Canada Bank and that it was to be renamed Duo Bank of Canada, to be styled simply as Duo Bank. Though exact ownership percentages were never revealed in either company announcement, it has also since been revealed that Duo Bank was reclassified as a Schedule 1 (domestic, deposit-taking) federally chartered bank of the Bank Act in Canada from the Schedule 2 (foreign-owned or -controlled, deposit-taking) that it had been, which indicates that Stephen Smith, as a noted Canadian businessman, is in a controlling position.

Africa 

On September 28, 2010, Walmart announced it would buy Massmart Holdings Ltd. of Johannesburg, South Africa in a deal worth over  giving the company its first footprint in Africa.  it has 411 stores, including 361 stores in South Africa (under the banners Game Foodco [78 locations], CBW [41 locations], Game [39 locations], Builders Express [50 locations], Builders Warehouse [34 locations], Cambridge [42 locations], Rhino [15 locations], Makro [23 locations], Builders Trade Depot [8 locations], Jumbo [13 locations], and Builders Superstore [18 locations]), 11 stores in Botswana (under the banners CBW [7 locations], Game Foodco [2 locations], and Builders Warehouse [2 locations]), 4 stores in Ghana (under the Game Foodco banner), 4 stores in Kenya (under the banners Game Foodco [3 locations] and Builders Warehouse [1 location]), 3 stores in Lesotho (under the banners CBW [2 locations] and Game Foodco [1 location]), 2 stores in Malawi (under the Game banner), 6 stores in Mozambique (under the banners Builders Warehouse [2 locations], Game Foodco [2 locations], CBW [1 location], and Builders Express [1 location]), 5 stores in Namibia (under the banners Game Foodco [4 locations] and Game [1 location]), 5 stores in Nigeria (under the banners Game [3 locations] and Game Foodco [2 location]), 1 store in Swaziland (under the CBW banner), 1 store in Tanzania (under the Game Foodco banner), 1 store in Uganda (under the Game banner), and 7 stores in Zambia (under the banners CBW [1 location], Game Foodco [3 locations], Builders Warehouse [2 locations], and Builders Express [1 location]).

China 

Walmart has joint ventures in China and several majority-owned subsidiaries.  Walmart China (沃尔玛 Wò'ērmǎ) operates 369 stores under the Walmart Supercenter (330 locations) and Sam's Club (39 locations) banners.

In February 2012, Walmart announced that the company raised its stake to 51 percent in Chinese online supermarket Yihaodian to tap rising consumer wealth and help the company offer more products. Walmart took full ownership in July 2015.

In December 2021, the Chinese Communist Party's Central Commission for Discipline Inspection warned Walmart about not stocking products made from inputs from Xinjiang in response to the Uyghur Forced Labor Prevention Act.

India 

In November 2006, the company announced a joint venture with Bharti Enterprises to operate in India. As foreign corporations were not allowed to enter the retail sector directly, Walmart operated through franchises and handled the wholesale end of the business. The partnership involved two joint ventures—Bharti manages the front end, involving opening of retail outlets while Walmart takes care of the back end, such as cold chains and logistics. Walmart operates stores in India under the name Best Price Modern Wholesale. The first store opened in Amritsar on May 30, 2009. On September 14, 2012, the Government of India approved 51 percent FDI in multi-brand retails, subject to approval by individual states, effective September 20, 2012. Scott Price, Walmart's president and CEO for Asia, told The Wall Street Journal that the company would be able to start opening Walmart stores in India within two years. Expansion into India faced some significant problems. In November 2012, Walmart admitted to spending  lobbying the Indian National Congress; lobbying is conventionally considered bribery in India. Walmart is conducting an internal investigation into potential violations of the Foreign Corrupt Practices Act. Bharti Walmart suspended a number of employees, rumored to include its CFO and legal team, to ensure "a complete and thorough investigation". In October 2013, Bharti and Walmart separated to pursue business independently.

On May 9, 2018, Walmart announced its intent to acquire a 77% majority stake in the Indian e-commerce company Flipkart for $16 billion, in a deal that was completed on August 18, 2018.  there are 28 Best Price Modern Wholesale locations.

Setbacks 

In the 1990s, Walmart tried with a large financial investment to get a foothold in both German and Indonesian retail markets.

Walmart entered Indonesia with the opening of stores in Lippo Supermall (now known as Supermal Karawaci) and Megamall Pluit (now known as Pluit Village) respectively, under a joint-venture agreement with local conglomerate Lippo Group. Both stores closed down due to the 1997 Asian financial crisis.

In 1997, Walmart took over the supermarket chain Wertkauf with its 21 stores for DM 750 million and the following year Walmart acquired 74 Interspar stores for DM 1.3 billion. The German market at this point was an oligopoly with high competition among companies which used a similar low price strategy as Walmart. As a result, Walmart's low price strategy yielded no competitive advantage. Walmart's corporate culture was not viewed positively among employees and customers, particularly Walmart's "statement of ethics", which attempted to restrict relationships between employees, a possible violation of German labor law, and led to a public discussion in the media, resulting in a bad reputation among customers. In July 2006, Walmart announced its withdrawal from Germany due to sustained losses. The stores were sold to the German company Metro during Walmart's fiscal third quarter. Walmart did not disclose its losses from its German investment, but they were estimated to be around 3 billion.

In 2004, Walmart bought the 118 stores in the Bompreço supermarket chain in northeastern Brazil. In late 2005, it took control of the Brazilian operations of Sonae Distribution Group through its new subsidiary, WMS Supermercados do Brasil, thus acquiring control of the Nacional and Mercadorama supermarket chains, the leaders in the Rio Grande do Sul and Paraná states, respectively. None of these stores were rebranded.  Walmart operated 61 Bompreço supermarkets, 39 Hiper Bompreço stores. It also ran 57 Walmart Supercenters, 27 Sam's Clubs, and 174 Todo Dia stores. With the acquisition of Bompreço and Sonae, by 2010, Walmart was the third-largest supermarket chain in Brazil, behind Carrefour and Pão de Açúcar.

Walmart Brasil, the operating company, has its head office in Barueri, São Paulo State, and regional offices in Curitiba, Paraná; Porto Alegre, Rio Grande do Sul; Recife, Pernambuco; and Salvador, Bahia. Walmart Brasil operates under the banners Todo Dia, Nacional, Bompreço, Walmart Supercenter, Maxxi Atacado, Hipermercado Big, Hiper Bompreço, Sam's Club, Mercadorama, Walmart Posto (Gas Station), Supermercado Todo Dia, and Hiper Todo Dia. Recently, the company started the conversion process of all Hiper Bompreço and Big stores into Walmart Supercenters and Bompreço, Nacional and Mercadorama stores into the Walmart Supermercado brand.

Since August 2018, Walmart Inc. only holds a minority stake in Walmart Brasil, which was renamed Grupo Big on August 12, 2019, with 20% of the company's shares, and private equity firm Advent International holding 80% ownership of the company. On March 24, 2021, it was announced that Carrefour would be acquiring Grupo Big.

Walmart Argentina was founded in 1995 and operates stores under the banners Walmart Supercenter, Changomas, Mi Changomas, and Punto Mayorista. On November 6, 2020, it was announced that Walmart has sold its Argentine operations to Grupo de Narváez.

Walmart's UK subsidiary Asda (which retained its name after being acquired by Walmart) is based in Leeds and accounted for 42.7  percent of 2006 sales of Walmart's international division. In contrast to the U.S. operations, Asda was originally and still remains primarily a grocery chain, but with a stronger focus on non-food items than most UK supermarket chains other than Tesco. In 2010 Asda acquired stores from Netto UK. In addition to small suburban Asda Supermarkets, larger stores are branded Supercentres. Other banners include Asda Superstores, Asda Living, and Asda Petrol Fueling Station. In July 2015, Asda updated its logo featuring the Walmart Asterisks behind the first 'A' in the Logo. In May 2018, Walmart announced plans to sell Asda to rival Sainsbury's for $10.1 billion. Under the terms of the deal, Walmart would have received a 42% stake in the combined company and about £3 billion in cash. However, in April 2019, the United Kingdom's Competition and Markets Authority blocked the proposed sale of Asda to Sainsburys.

On October 2, 2020, it was announced that Walmart will sell a majority stake of Asda to a consortium of Zuber and Mohsin Issa (the owners of EG Group) and private equity firm TDR Capital for £6.8bn, pending approval from the Competition and Markets Authority.

In Japan, Walmart owned 100 percent of Seiyu (西友 Seiyū)  It operates under the Seiyu (Hypermarket), Seiyu (Supermarket), Seiyu (General Merchandise), Livin, and Sunny banners. 
On November 16, 2020, Walmart announced they would be selling 65% of their shares in the company to the private-equity firm KKR in a deal valuing 329 stores and 34,600 employees at $1.6 billion. Walmart is supposed to retain 15% and a seat on the board, while a joint-venture between KKR and Japanese company Rakuten Inc. will receive 20%.

Corruption charges 

An April 2012 investigation by The New York Times reported the allegations of a former executive of Walmart de Mexico that, in September 2005, the company had paid bribes via local fixers to officials throughout Mexico in exchange for construction permits, information, and other favors, which gave Walmart a substantial advantage over competitors. Walmart investigators found credible evidence that Mexican and American laws had been broken. Concerns were also raised that Walmart executives in the United States had "hushed up" the allegations. A follow-up investigation by The New York Times, published December 17, 2012, revealed evidence that regulatory permission for siting, construction, and operation of nineteen stores had been obtained through bribery. After the initial article was released, Walmart released a statement denying the allegations and describing its anti-corruption policy. While an official Walmart report states that it had found no evidence of corruption, the article alleges that previous internal reports had indeed turned up such evidence before the story became public. Forbes magazine contributor Adam Hartung also commented that the bribery scandal was a reflection of Walmart's "serious management and strategy troubles", stating, "[s]candals are now commonplace ... [e]ach scandal points out that Walmart's strategy is harder to navigate and is running into big problems".

In 2012, there was an incident with CJ's Seafood, a crawfish processing firm in Louisiana that was partnered with Walmart, that eventually gained media attention for the mistreatment of its 40 H-2B visa workers from Mexico. These workers experienced harsh living conditions in tightly packed trailers outside of the work facility, physical threats, verbal abuse, and were forced to work day-long shifts. Many of the workers were afraid to take action about the abuse due to the fact that the manager threatened the lives of their family members in the U.S. and Mexico if the abuse were to be reported. Eight of the workers confronted management at CJ's Seafood about the mistreatment; however, the management denied the abuse allegations and the workers went on strike. The workers then took their stories to Walmart due to their partnership with CJ's. While Walmart was investigating the situation, the workers collected 150,000 signatures of supporters who agreed that Walmart should stand by the workers and take action. In June 2012, the visa workers held a protest and day-long hunger strike outside of the apartment building where a Walmart board member resided. Following this protest, Walmart announced its final decision to no longer work with CJ's Seafood. Less than a month later, the Department of Labor fined CJ's Seafood "approximately $460,000 in back-pay, safety violations, wage and hour violations, civil damages, and fines for abuses to the H-2B program. The company has since shut down."

 internal investigations were ongoing into possible violations of the Foreign Corrupt Practices Act. Walmart has invested  on internal investigations, which expanded beyond Mexico to implicate operations in China, Brazil, and India. The case has added fuel to the debate as to whether foreign investment will result in increased prosperity, or if it merely allows local retail trade and economic policy to be taken over by "foreign financial and corporate interests".

Sam's Club 

Sam's Club is a chain of warehouse clubs that sell groceries and general merchandise, often in bulk. The first Sam's Club was opened by Walmart, Inc. in 1983 in Midwest City, Oklahoma under the name "Sam's Wholesale Club". The chain was named after its founder Sam Walton. As of October 31, 2022, Sam's Club operated 600 membership warehouse clubs and accounted for 11.3% of Walmart's revenue at $57.839 billion in fiscal year 2019. Kathryn McLay is the president and CEO of Sam's Club.

Global eCommerce 
Based in San Bruno, California, Walmart's Global eCommerce division provides online retailing for Walmart, Sam's Club, Asda, and all other international brands. There are several locations in the United States in California and Oregon: San Bruno, Sunnyvale, Brisbane, and Portland. Locations outside of the United States include Shanghai (China), Leeds (United Kingdom), and Bangalore (India).

Subsidiaries

Private label brands 

About 40 percent of products sold in Walmart are private labels, which are produced for the company through contracts with manufacturers. Walmart began offering private label brands in 1991, with the launch of Sam's Choice, a line of drinks produced by Cott Beverages for Walmart. Sam's Choice quickly became popular and by 1993, was the third-most-popular beverage brand in the United States. Other Walmart brands include Great Value and Equate in the U.S. and Canada and Smart Price in Britain. A 2006 study talked of "the magnitude of mind-share Walmart appears to hold in the shoppers' minds when it comes to the awareness of private label brands and retailers."

Entertainment 

In 2010, the company teamed with Procter & Gamble to produce Secrets of the Mountain and The Jensen Project, two-hour family movies which featured the characters using Walmart and Procter & Gamble-branded products. The Jensen Project also featured a preview of a product to be released in several months in Walmart stores. A third movie, A Walk in My Shoes, also aired in 2010 and a fourth is in production. Walmart's director of brand marketing also serves as co-chair of the Association of National Advertisers's Alliance for Family Entertainment.

Online commerce acquisitions and plans 
In September 2016, Walmart purchased e-commerce company Jet.com, founded in 2014 by Marc Lore, to start competing with Amazon.com. Jet.com has acquired its own share of online retailers such as Hayneedle in March 2016, Shoebuy.com in December 2016, and ModCloth in March 2017. Walmart also acquired Parcel, a delivery service in New York, on September 29, 2017.

On February 15, 2017, Walmart acquired Moosejaw, an online active outdoor retailer, for approximately $51 million. Moosejaw brought with it partnerships with more than 400 brands, including Patagonia, The North Face, Marmot, and Arc'teryx.

Marc Lore, Walmart's U.S. e-commerce CEO, said that Walmart's existing physical infrastructure of almost 5,000 stores around the U.S. will enhance their digital expansion by doubling as warehouses for e-commerce without increasing overhead.  Walmart offers in-store pickup for online orders at 1,000 stores with plans to eventually expand the service to all of its stores.

On May 9, 2018, Walmart announced its intent to acquire a 77% controlling stake in the Indian e-commerce website Flipkart for $16 billion (beating bids by Amazon.com), subject to regulatory approval. Following its completion, the website's management will report to Marc Lore. Completion of the deal was announced on August 18, 2018.

The company's partnership with subscription service Kidbox was announced on April 16, 2019.

Corporate affairs 

Walmart is headquartered in the Walmart Home Office complex in Bentonville, Arkansas. The company's business model is based on selling a wide variety of general merchandise at low prices. Doug McMillon became Walmart's CEO on February 1, 2014. He has also worked as the head of Sam's Club and Walmart International. The company refers to its employees as "associates". All Walmart stores in the U.S. and Canada also have designated "greeters" at the entrance, a practice pioneered by Sam Walton and later imitated by other retailers. Greeters are trained to help shoppers find what they want and answer their questions.

For many years, associates were identified in the store by their signature blue vest, but this practice was discontinued in June 2007 and replaced with khaki pants and polo shirts. The wardrobe change was part of a larger corporate overhaul to increase sales and rejuvenate the company's stock price. In September 2014, the uniform was again updated to bring back a vest (paid for by the company) for store employees over the same polos and khaki or black pants paid for by the employee. The vest is navy blue for Walmart employees at Supercenters and discounts stores, lime green for Walmart Neighborhood Market employees, and yellow for self-check-out associates; door greeters, and customer service managers. All three state "Proud Walmart Associate" on the left breast and the "Spark" logo covering the back. Reportedly one of the main reasons the vest was reintroduced was that some customers had trouble identifying employees. In 2016, self-checkout associates, door greeters and customer service managers began wearing a yellow vest to be better seen by customers. By requiring employees to wear uniforms that are made up of standard "streetwear", Walmart is not required to purchase the uniforms or reimburse employees which are required in some states, as long as that clothing can be worn elsewhere. Businesses are only legally required to pay for branded shirts and pants or clothes that would be difficult to wear outside of work.

Unlike many other retailers, Walmart does not charge slotting fees to suppliers for their products to appear in the store. Instead, it focuses on selling more-popular products and provides incentives for store managers to drop unpopular products.

From 2006 to 2010, the company eliminated its layaway program. In 2011, the company revived its layaway program.

Walmart introduced its Site-To-Store program in 2007, after testing the program since 2004 on a limited basis. The program allows walmart.com customers to buy goods online with a free shipping option, and have goods shipped to the nearest store for pickup.

On September 15, 2017, Walmart announced that it would build a new headquarters in Bentonville to replace its current 1971 building and consolidate operations that have spread out to 20 different buildings throughout Bentonville.

According to watchdog group Documented, in 2020 Walmart contributed $140,000 to the Rule of Law Defense Fund, a fund-raising arm of the Republican Attorneys General Association.

Finance and governance 
The company's international operations accounted for $120.824 billion, or 23.7 percent, of its $510.329 billion of sales. Walmart is the world's 29th-largest public corporation, according to the Forbes Global 2000 list, and the largest public corporation when ranked by revenue.

Walmart is governed by an eleven-member board of directors elected annually by shareholders. Gregory B. Penner, son-in-law of S. Robson Walton and the grandson-in-law of Sam Walton, serves as chairman of the board. Doug McMillon serves as president and chief executive officer. Current members of the board are:
 Gregory B. Penner, chairman of the board of directors of Walmart Inc. and general partner of Madrone Capital Partners
 Cesar Conde, chairman of NBCUniversal International Group and NBCUniversal Telemundo Enterprises
 Timothy P. Flynn, retired CEO of KPMG International
 Sarah Friar, CEO of Nextdoor
 Carla A. Harris, Vice-chairman of Wealth Management, head of multicultural client strategy, managing director, and senior client advisor at Morgan Stanley
 Tom Horton, senior advisor at Warburg Pincus, LLC, and retired chairman and CEO of American Airlines
 Marissa A. Mayer, co-founder of Lumi Labs, Inc., and former president and CEO of Yahoo!, Inc.
 Doug McMillon, president and CEO of Walmart
 Randall Stephenson, retired chairman and CEO of AT&T Inc.
 S. Robson "Rob" Walton, retired chairman of the board of directors of Walmart Inc.
 Steuart Walton, founder of RZC Investments, LLC.

Notable former members of the board include Hillary Clinton (1985–1992) and Tom Coughlin (2003–2004), the latter having served as vice chairman. Clinton left the board before the 1992 U.S. presidential election, and Coughlin left in December 2005 after pleading guilty to wire fraud and tax evasion for stealing hundreds of thousands of dollars from Walmart.

After Sam Walton's death in 1992, Don Soderquist, Chief Operating Officer and Senior Vice Chairman, became known as the "Keeper of the Culture".

Ownership 
Walmart Inc. is a Delaware-domiciled joint-stock company registered with the U.S. Securities and Exchange Commission, with its registered office located in Wolters Kluwer's Corporation Trust Center in Wilmington.  it has 3,292,377,090 outstanding shares. These are held mainly by the Walton family, a number of institutions and funds.
 43.00% (1,415,891,131): Walton Enterprises LLC
 5.30% (174,563,205): Walton family Holdings Trust
 3.32% (102,036,399): The Vanguard Group, Inc
 2.37% (72,714,226): State Street Corporation
 1.37% (42,171,892): BlackRock Institutional Trust Company
 0.94% (28,831,721): Vanguard Total Stock Market Index Fund
 0.77% (23,614,578): BlackRock Fund Advisors
 0.71% (21,769,126): Dodge & Cox Inc
 0.68% (20,978,727): Vanguard 500 Index Fund
 0.65% (20,125,838): Bank of America Corporation
 0.57% (17,571,058): Bank of New York Mellon Corporation
 0.57% (17,556,128): Northern Trust Corporation
 0.55% (16,818,165): Vanguard Institutional Index Fund-Institutional Index Fund
 0.55% (16,800,850): State Farm Mutual Automobile Insurance Co
 0.52% (15,989,827): SPDR S&P 500 ETF Trust

Competition 
In North America, Walmart's primary competitors include grocery stores and department stores like Aldi, Lidl, Kmart, Kroger, Ingles, Publix, Target, Harris Teeter, Meijer, and Winn Dixie in the United States; Hudson's Bay, Loblaw retail stores, Sobeys, Metro, and Giant Tiger in Canada; and Comercial Mexicana and Soriana in Mexico. Competitors of Walmart's Sam's Club division are Costco and the smaller BJ's Wholesale Club chain. Walmart's move into the grocery business in the late 1990s set it against major supermarket chains in both the United States and Canada.  Studies have typically found that Walmart's prices are significantly lower than those of their competitors, and that Walmart's presence is associated with lower food prices for households. Comparisons of performance metrics such as sales per square foot suggest that supermarkets in direct competition with Walmart Supercenters show significant decreases in profit margins, an effect that is strongest in the case of unionized competitors. Between 2000 and 2010, Walmart's entry into new areas often lowered local food prices at other stores. However, recent studies have not found the same effect, suggesting that retailers may have changed their competitive strategies.

While the idea that Walmart destroys small businesses is widely assumed to be true, research so far suggests that Walmart superstores have little effect on smaller retailers such as "Mom and Pop" businesses. Differences in impact appear to be specific to the goods sold.  Small retailers may experience difficulty if they rely on selling products identical to those at Walmart or if they try to sell at lower prices.
Dollar stores such as Family Dollar and Dollar General have been able to find a small niche market and compete successfully against Walmart. In 2004, Walmart responded by testing its own dollar store concept, a subsection of some stores called "Pennies-n-Cents".

Walmart also had to face fierce competition in some foreign markets. For example, in Germany it had captured just 2 percent of the German food market following its entry into the market in 1997 and remained "a secondary player" behind Aldi with 19 percent. Walmart continues to do well in the UK, where its Asda subsidiary is the second-largest retailer.

Shinsegae re-branded the Walmarts as E-mart stores.

Walmart struggled to export its brand elsewhere as it rigidly tried to reproduce its model overseas. In China, Walmart hopes to succeed by adapting and doing things preferable to Chinese citizens. For example, it found that Chinese consumers preferred to select their own live fish and seafood; stores began displaying the meat uncovered and installed fish tanks, leading to higher sales.

Customer base 

In the United States, Walmart's early growth occurred in the Southeast and lower Midwest.  More recently, Walmart has expanded throughout the country.  The number of Walmart stores per 1,000 people in 2019 was highest in Arkansas, Oklahoma, Louisiana, Alabama and Kansas, and lowest in Hawaii, California, New Jersey, Massachusetts and New York. California and New Jersey were two of the ten states with the largest increases in Supercenters between 2011 and 2020, along with Pennsylvania, Illinois, and Wisconsin.

Walmart customers display strong customer loyalty and cite low prices as the most important reason for shopping there. Walmart has characterized their shoppers as falling into three main groups: "value-price shoppers" (people who like low prices and cannot afford much more), "brand aspirationals" (people with low incomes who buy well-known brands in hopes of assuring quality), and "price-sensitive affluents" (wealthier shoppers who seek deals).  the average U.S. Walmart customer earned about $80,000 per year, above the U.S. average personal income of $63,214. Walmart reports that during times of rising inflation, customers become more sensitive to rising food prices, buying less expensive food items such as hot dogs and canned tuna rather than deli cold cuts. They also see more upper-income shoppers looking for bargains.

Walmart shoppers have been reported to be politically conservative.  A poll after the 2004 US presidential election reported that 76 percent of voters who shopped at Walmart once a week reported voting for George W. Bush while only 23 percent supported senator John Kerry.  When measured against similar retailers in the U.S. in 2006, frequent Walmart shoppers were rated the most politically conservative.   54 percent of Americans who preferred to shop at Walmart reported that they opposed same-sex marriage, while 40 percent were in favor, reflecting the store's southern roots.

Due to its concentration of stores in the Bible Belt, Walmart is known for its "tradition of tailoring its service to churchgoing customers". Walmart has carried clean versions of hip-hop audio CDs and in cooperation with The Timothy Plan, placed "plastic sheathes over suggestive women's periodicals and banned 'lad mags' such as Maxim" magazine. Walmart also caters to its Christian customer base by selling Christian books and media,  such as VeggieTales videos and The Purpose-Driven Life, earning the company over  annually.

In 2006, Walmart took steps to expand its U.S. customer base, announcing a modification in its U.S. stores from a "one-size-fits-all" merchandising strategy to one designed to "reflect each of six demographic groups—African-Americans, the affluent, empty-nesters, Hispanics, suburbanites, and rural residents." Around six months later, it unveiled a new slogan: "Saving people money so they can live better lives".

Walmart has also made steps to appeal to more liberal customers, for example, by rejecting the American Family Association's recommendations and carrying the DVD Brokeback Mountain, a love story between two gay cowboys in Wyoming.

Sales of guns and ammunition
Walmart stopped selling handguns in all U.S. states, except for Alaska, in 1993.

In 2018, Walmart stopped selling guns and ammunition to persons younger than 21, following a similar move by Dick's Sporting Goods on the same day. In the same year, Walmart stopped selling military-style rifles that were commonly used in mass shootings.

As of 2019, Walmart was a major retailer of firearms and ammunition. In 2019, after 23 people were killed in a mass shooting at a Walmart store in El Paso, Texas, Walmart announced that it would stop selling all handgun ammunition and certain short-barreled rifle ammunition. The company also announced that it would stop selling handguns in Alaska, the only state where the company still sold handguns. The move was expected to reduce Walmart's U.S. market share in ammunition from around 20% to around 6–9%. Walmart also stated that it was "respectfully requesting" that customers not openly carry weapons in Walmart stores, except for authorized law enforcement officers.

Following the fatal police shooting of Walter Wallace Jr. in October 2020, Walmart temporarily removed gun and ammunition displays in thousands of stores across the U.S. from sales floors, grounding their reason in concerns of civil unrest. Company spokesman Kory Lundberg said in a statement that "We have seen some isolated civil unrest and as we have done on several occasions over the last few years, we have moved our firearms and ammunition off the sales floor as a precaution for the safety of our associates and customers." Firearms and ammunition will still be available for purchase on request, but the duration of the removal of both from the sales floor remains undetermined.

Technology

Open source software 
Many Walmart technology projects are coded in the open and available through the Walmart Labs GitHub repository as open-source software under the OSI approved Apache V2.0 license.  141 public GitHub projects are listed.

During a migration of the walmart.com retail platform to Facebook React and Node.js, the Electrode project was created to power the e-commerce platform which serves 80 million visitors per month and 15 million items.

The electrode provides various developer enhancements and tools for the developer including Node.js configuration and feature management.

Alex Grigoryan of Walmart Labs released a statement on Medium.com on October 3, 2016, explaining the details of the applications and the scale that they operate at Walmart.

Big data analytics 
As the largest retailer in the U.S., Walmart collects and analyzes a large amount of consumer data. The big data sets are mined for use in predictive analytics, which allow the company to optimize operations by predicting customer's habits. Walmart's datacenter is unofficially referred to as Area 71.

In April 2011, Walmart acquired Kosmix to develop software for analyzing real-time data streams. In August 2012, Walmart announced its Polaris search engine.

The amount of data gathered by Walmart has raised privacy concerns.

Cash handling 
in 2016, Walmart began a drive to automate much of the cash handling process. Walmart began replacing employees who count currency by hand with machines that count 8 bills per second and 3,000 coins a minute. The processing machines, located in the back of stores, allow cashiers to process the money for electronic depositing.

Charity 
Sam Walton believed that the company's contribution to society was the fact that it operated efficiently, thereby lowering the cost of living for customers, and, therefore, in that sense was a "powerful force for good", despite his refusal to contribute cash to philanthropic causes. Having begun to feel that his wealth attracted people who wanted nothing more than a "handout", he explained that while he believed his family had been fortunate and wished to use his wealth to aid worthy causes like education, they could not be expected to "solve every personal problem that comes to [their] attention". He explained later in his autobiography, "We feel very strongly that Wal-Mart really is not, and should not be, in the charity business," stating "any debit has to be passed along to somebody—either shareholders or our customers." Since Sam Walton's death in 1992, however, Walmart and the Walmart Foundation dramatically increased charitable giving. For example, in 2005, Walmart donated  in cash and merchandise for Hurricane Katrina relief and in 2020 they committed $25 million to organizations on the frontlines of the COVID-19 pandemic response. Today, Walmart's charitable donations approach  each year.

COVID-19 
As of January 2021, healthcare workers could get vaccines through Walmart in New Mexico and Arkansas. Walmart planned to offer vaccines in Georgia, Indiana, Louisiana, Maryland, New Jersey, South Carolina, Texas, Chicago and Puerto Rico with the target of delivering between 10 million and 13 million doses per month at full capacity.

In May 2021, Walmart said that starting from May 18 all its fully vaccinated employees can stop wearing masks at work following the guidance from the U.S. Centers for Disease Control and Prevention.

Economic impact

Effects on customers 
A study in 2005 at the Massachusetts Institute of Technology (MIT) measured the effect on consumer welfare and found that the poorest segment of the population benefits the most from the existence of discount retailers. 
In 2006, American newspaper columnist George Will stated that In terms of economic effects, "Wal-Mart and its effects save shoppers more than  a year, dwarfing such government programs as food stamps and the earned income tax credit".

Effects on retailers
Kenneth Stone, Professor of Economics at Iowa State University, in a paper published in Farm Foundation (1997), found that some small towns can lose almost half of their retail trade within ten years of a Walmart store opening.  Presumably, people who previously shopped in towns without Wal-Mart stores  choose to shop in towns with Wal-Mart stores, part of an older pattern in which smaller centers lose retail sales to larger ones. Stone compared the changes to previous competitors that small town shops have faced in the past, such as the development of the railroads, the Sears Roebuck catalog, and shopping malls. He concluded that small towns are more affected by "discount mass merchandiser stores" than larger towns and that shop owners who adapt to the ever-changing retail market can "co-exist and even thrive in this type of environment." In later research Artz and Stone (2006) reported that in MIssissippi the impact of opening a Walmart was much larger on existing retailers in rural communities (17%) than more urban ones (4%). This also suggests that Walmart has achieved its strongest growth in non-metropolitan areas, which tend to be low-income.

Studies of the impact of Walmart tend to focus on Supercenters rather than Neighborhood Markets. Comparisons of performance metrics such as sales per square foot suggest that supermarkets and other high-volume retailers in direct competition with Walmart Supercenters show significant decreases in profit margins.  While Walmart has often been said to be a destroyer of small businesses, much of this is anecdotal.  Research so far suggests that Walmart superstores have little effect on smaller retailers such as "Mom and Pop" businesses.  A 2008 economic analysis published in the journal Economic Inquiry suggested that "the process of creative destruction unleashed by Wal‐Mart has had no statistically significant long‐run impact on the overall size and profitability of the small business sector in the United States."

Impact appears to be related to a number of factors, with a key factor being the goods offered for sale. A study by Ailawadi and others (2010) examined the impact of new Walmarts in detail.  She reported that median sales dropped 40 percent at similar high-volume stores, 17 percent at supermarkets and 6 percent at drugstores. However, 30 percent of specific product categories at high-volume stores were unaffected. Many retailers reduced prices and cut product selection in an attempt to compete directly with Walmart, in effect attacking its areas  of strength. A more successful approach was to track sales, identify vulnerable categories, and increase the range of products in those categories. By including products at both top and bottom price points, and offering temporary promotions on those items, retailers could attract both customers who were price-conscious and those interested in a wider range of options. A small store that specialized in a particular product area could compete effectively against Walmart. Small specialized stores are less effective against big-box category killer chains such as Home Depot and Best Buy electronics.

Some studies have suggested that the impact a Walmart store has on a local business is correlated to its distance from the store. David Merriman, Joseph Persky, Julie Davis and Ron Baiman (2012) outlined the impacts of Walmart in Chicago. Based on three annual surveys of enterprises within a four-mile radius of a new Chicago Walmart it "shows that the probability of going out of business was significantly higher for establishments close to that store". The overall findings of this study reinforce the "contention that large-city Walmarts, like those in small towns, absorb retail sales from nearby stores without significantly expanding the market".   Ellickson & Grieco (2013) report in the Journal of Urban Economics that Wal-Marts most strongly affect outlets of larger chains that are within   of their location.

Effects on jobs 
A 2022 literature review concludes that "there is no consensus on the impact of Walmart on local employment, but most studies on the topic point to a modest increase in retail employment". For example, studies at the University of Missouri found that a new store increases net retail employment in the county by 100 jobs in the short term, half of which disappear over five years as other retail establishments close. Similarly, a net increase in employment (55 jobs) was found in a study of West Virginia counties between 1989 and 1998.

Like other chain stores, Walmart tends to hire local employees for low-skilled jobs with low wages and minimal benefits.  This may increase employees’ reliance on public assistance programs, effectively transferring costs away from employers onto taxpayers. Studies examining aggregate retail wage data from states and counties, before and after the arrival of Walmart, are mixed.  Some results, particularly from nonmetropolitan areas in the South and central United States, suggest lowered wages. Other studies have found no effect (e.g. Pennsylvania) or an increase in wages (e,g, Maryland).  A 2004 paper by Goetz and Swaminathan suggested that U.S. counties with Walmart stores suffered increased poverty compared with counties without Wal-Marts.  It is difficult to distinguish the effects of opening a Walmart from other factors that occur in the same time and place, some of which may be related to the decision to open a store. Known as endogeneity bias, this makes it difficult to determine whether Walmart chooses to establish itself in communities with greater poverty and joblessness, or creates more poverty and joblessness.

Studies of socioeconomic well-being, civic participation, and community welfare suggest that large non-locally owned businesses tend to be centralized and vertically integrated, rely on remote sources and support services, and move money, expertise and power away from local communities.  Large externally-oriented businesses tend to be associated with lower local standards of living, greater inequality, and less social and civic participation.  In contrast, locally oriented businesses are associated with higher rates of church membership, community engagement, civic improvement and recreation. They may also be associated with higher rates of home-ownership and expenditures on health and public schools. The presence of local entrepreneurs with resources and motivation to invest in local communities may be key to addressing community problems. This research is not specific to Walmart, but to large businesses in general.

In broader economic terms, the Economic Policy Institute estimated that between 2001 and 2006 Wal-Mart's trade deficit with China alone represented a loss of nearly 200,000 U.S. jobs. During this period, Wal-Mart was responsible for 9.3% of total U.S. imports from China, increasing the U.S. trade deficit by an estimated $17.1 billion. This represents about 200,000 jobs, most of them in the manufacturing sector (133,000).

A 2014 story in The Guardian reported that the Wal-Mart Foundation was boosting its efforts to work with U.S. manufacturers. In February 2014, the Walmart Foundation pledged to support domestic manufacturers by buying  worth of American-made products in the next decade. Between 2014 and 2017, the Walmart U.S. Manufacturing Innovation Fund gave $10 million in grants to research and academic institutions for projects that improve domestic manufacturing. For the 2020 fiscal year, Walmart reported that nearly two-thirds of its merchandise was made, assembled or grown in the United States.  As of March 2021, Walmart pledged to buy an additional $350 billion worth of American-based items over the next decade.

Effects on productivity 
A 2001 McKinsey Global Institute study of U.S. labor productivity growth between 1995 and 2000 concluded that "Wal-Mart directly and indirectly caused the bulk of the productivity acceleration" in general merchandise, representing 16 percent of total productivity growth in the retail sector.
Walmart's transformative use of information technology, particularly in supply-chain management, is identified as a major reason for its impact on productivity per man hour. For every dollar spent by Walmart to improve its own technology, an estimated ten dollars has been invested by suppliers throughout its supply chain on their own systems and software. Economist Robert Solow has emphasized the importance of imitation and adaptation, as well as innovation. In addition to improving its own efficiency,  Walmart's innovations have been adopted by its competitors so that they can compete.

Labor relations

With over 2.3 million employees worldwide, Walmart has faced a torrent of lawsuits and issues with regards to its workforce. These issues involve low wages, poor working conditions, inadequate health care, and issues involving the company's strong anti-union policies. In November 2013, the National Labor Relations Board (NLRB) announced that it had found that in 13 U.S. states, Wal-Mart had pressured employees not to engage in strikes on Black Friday, and had illegally disciplined workers who had engaged in strikes. Critics point to Walmart's high turnover rate as evidence of an unhappy workforce, although other factors may be involved. Approximately 70 percent of its employees leave within the first year. Despite this turnover rate, the company is still able to affect unemployment rates. This was found in a study by Oklahoma State University which states, "Walmart is found to have substantially lowered the relative unemployment rates of blacks in those counties where it is present, but to have had only a limited impact on relative incomes after the influences of other socio-economic variables were taken into account."

Walmart is the largest private employer in the United States, with 1.6 million employees as of 2020. Walmart employs almost five times as many people as IBM, the second-largest employer. Walmart employs more African Americans than any other private employer in the United States.
While  4.6% of all retail workers, and 16.5% of all US grocery workers, were unionized as of 2020, Walmart does not employ unionized labor and actively discourages unionization and collective bargaining.

Walmart rebranded their Associate Education Benefits to Live Better U in March 2019. Live Better U supports associate education at every level and includes $1 a day college program, cost-free high school education, and discounts on higher education programs through partnership with Guild Education.

In April 2019, Walmart Inc. announced plans to extend the use of robots in stores in order to improve and monitor inventory, clean floors and unload trucks, part of the company's effort to lower its labor costs.

In June 2019, Walmart Inc. announced the expansion of education benefits to recruit high school students. The incentives include flexible work schedules, free SAT and ACT preparation courses, up to seven hours of free college credit, and a debt-free college degree in three fields from six nonprofit universities.

Gender
In 2007, a gender discrimination lawsuit, Dukes v. Wal-Mart Stores, Inc., was filed against Walmart, alleging that female employees were discriminated against in matters regarding pay and promotions. A class action suit was sought, which would have been the nation's largest in history, covering 1.5 million past and current employees. On June 20, 2011, the United States Supreme Court ruled in Wal-Mart's favor, stating that the plaintiffs did not have enough in common to constitute a class. The court ruled unanimously that because of the variability of the plaintiffs' circumstances, the class action could not proceed as presented, and furthermore, in a 5–4 decision that it could not proceed as any kind of class action suit. Several plaintiffs, including the lead plaintiff, Betty Dukes, expressed their intent to file individual discrimination lawsuits separately. Dukes died in 2017. In 2020, Walmart agreed to pay $20 million, stop using a pre-employment test, and furnish other relief to settle a companywide, sex-based hiring discrimination lawsuit filed by the U.S. Equal Employ­ment Opportunity Commission (EEOC).

According to a consultant hired by plaintiffs in a sex discrimination lawsuit, in 2001, Wal-Mart's Equal Employment Opportunity Commission filings showed that female employees made up 65 percent of Wal-Mart's hourly paid workforce, but only 33 percent of its management. Just 35 percent of its store managers were women, compared to 57 percent at similar retailers. Wal-Mart says comparisons with other retailers are unfair, because it classifies employees differently; if department managers were included in the totals, women would make up 60 percent of the managerial ranks.

Sexual orientation and gender identity
In the Human Rights Campaign's (HRC) 2002 Corporate Equality Index, a measure of how companies treat LGBT employees and customers, gave Wal-Mart Stores Inc. a score of 14%. By 2017, however, HRC's 2017 Corporate Equality Index gave Wal-Mart Stores Inc. a score of a 100%. In 2003, Walmart added sexual orientation to their anti-discrimination policy. In 2005, Walmart's definition of family began including same-sex partners. In 2006, Walmart announced that "diversity efforts include new groups of minority, female and gay employees that meet at Walmart headquarters in Bentonville to advise the company on marketing and internal promotion. There are seven business resource groups: women, African Americans, Hispanics, Asians, Native Americans, gays and lesbians, and a disabled group." From 2006 to 2008, Walmart was a member of the National Gay & Lesbian Chamber of Commerce. In 2011, Walmart added gender identity to their anti-discrimination policy. Walmart's anti-discrimination policies allow associates to use restroom facilities that corresponds with their gender identity and gender expression. In 2013, Walmart began offering health insurance benefits to domestic partners. In 2015, Doug McMillon, CEO of Walmart, issued a statement opposing House Bill 1228 and asked Governor Asa Hutchinson to veto the bill. In 2016, Walmart added full healthcare benefits to its transgender employees.

Criticism and controversies

 
 
Walmart has been subject to criticism from various groups and individuals, including labor unions, community groups, grassroots organizations, religious organizations, environmental groups, firearm groups, and the company's own customers and employees. They have protested against the company's policies and business practices, including charges of racial and gender discrimination. Other areas of criticism include the company's foreign product sourcing, treatment of suppliers, employee compensation and working conditions, environmental practices, the use of public subsidies, the company's security policies, and slavery. Walmart denies doing anything wrong and maintains that low prices are the result of efficiency.

In April 2016, Walmart announced that it plans to eliminate eggs from battery cages from its supply chain by 2025. The decision was particularly important because of Walmart's large market share and influence on the rest of the industry. The move was praised by major animal welfare groups but a poultry trade group representative expressed skepticism about the decision's impact. Walmart's cage-free eggs will not come from free range producers, but rather industrial-scale farms where the birds will be allotted between 1 and 1.5 square feet each, a stressful arrangement which can cause cannibalism. Unlike battery cages, the systems of Walmart's suppliers allow the hens to move around, but relative to battery cages they have higher hen mortality rates and present distinct environmental and worker health problems.

In March 2018, Walmart was sued by former Director of Business Development Tri Huynh for claims of reporting misleading e-commerce performance results in favor of the company. Huynh stated the company's move was an attempt to regain lost ground to competitor Amazon.

In September 2018, Walmart was sued by Equal Employment Opportunity Commission alleging that Walmart denied requests from pregnant employees to limit heavy lifting.

In May 2019, the Center for Inquiry filed a lawsuit in the District of Columbia alleging consumer fraud and the endangering of its customers' health due to Walmart's practice of "selling homeopathic [products] alongside real medicine, in the same sections in its stores, under the same signs," according to Nicholas Little, CFI's vice president and general counsel. On May 20, 2020, District of Columbia Superior Court Judge Florence Pan dismissed CFI's lawsuit, claiming that CFI had no standing as a consumer protection organization and failed to identify the specific actions on the part of Walmart that lead to harm to consumers. CFI has challenged both of those arguments and is planning an appeal.

In July 2019, the Walmart subreddit was flooded with pro-union memes in a protest to the firing of an employee who posted confidential material to the subreddit. Many of these posts were angry with Walmart surveying its staff on the Internet. The posting of the union content is in response to the aforementioned alleged anti-union position Walmart has taken in the past.

In November 2021, a federal jury found that Walmart, along with Walgreens and CVS, "had substantially contributed to" the opioid crisis. The damages between the three chains in this suit totalled $650 million. Damages claimed by the lawyers for Lake County and Trumbull County in Ohio were $3.3 billion. Two other chains, Rite Aid and Giant Eagle, settled with these counties for undisclosed sums before going to trial.

In June 2022, the Federal Trade Commission (FTC) sued Walmart, alleging that the company facilitated money transfer fraud. The FTC claimed that Walmart allowed its money transfer services to be used by scammers who stole hundreds of millions of dollars from customers.

2010s crime problem
According to an August 2016 report by Bloomberg Businessweek, aggressive cost-cutting decisions that began in 2000 when Lee Scott took over as CEO of the company led to a significant increase in crime in stores across the United States. These included the removal of the store's famed greeters, who are in part seen as a theft deterrent at exits, the replacement of many cashiers with self-checkout stations, and the addition of stores at a rate that exceeded the hiring of new employees, which led to a 19% increase in space per employee from a decade previous. While these decisions succeeded in increasing profits 23% in the decade that followed, they also led to an increase in both theft and violent crime.

In 2015, under CEO Doug McMillon, Walmart began a company-wide campaign to reduce crime that included spot-checking receipts at exits, stationing employees at self-checkout areas, eye-level security cameras in high-theft areas, use of data analytics to detect credit fraud, hiring off-duty police and private security officers, and reducing calls to police with a program by which first-time offenders caught stealing merchandise below a certain value can avoid arrest if they agree to go through a theft-prevention program.

Law enforcement agencies across the United States have noted a burden on resources created by a disproportionate number of calls from Walmart. Experts have criticized the retailer for shifting its security burden onto the taxpayers. Across three Florida counties, approximately 9,000 police calls were logged to 53 Walmart stores but resulted in only a few hundred arrests. In Granite Falls, North Carolina, 92% of larceny calls to local police were from the Walmart store there. The trend is similar in rural, suburban, and urban areas. Police are called to Walmart stores 3 to 4 times as much as similar retailers such as Target. Experts say the chain and its razor-thin profit margins rely heavily on police to protect its bottom line. Walmart Supercenters top the list of those most visited by police.

The police captain in Port Richey, Florida, said that Target stores more often have uniformed security, as well as more visible staff in any case. Another comparison might be shopping malls which often have security patrols and off-duty police officers. J.R. Roberts, a former director for risk management at Valor Security Services (which provides mall security) says: "Shopping centers all have security; they know it's an expense, but one they know pays dividends because people feel safer going to their stores."

In addition to hundreds of thousands of petty crimes, more than 200 violent crimes, including attempted kidnappings, stabbings, shootings, and murders occurred at the 4,500 Walmarts in the U.S. in 2016. In 2019, 23 people were killed in a mass shooting at a Walmart store in El Paso, Texas.

On June 27, 2020, a shooting occurred at a Walmart distribution center in Red Bluff, California, United States. One employee was killed, four other employees were wounded, and the shooter was killed by officers.

In April 2022, Walmart decided to take service dog paraphernalia out of stores and online, following an online petition to have them stop selling service dog vests.

In popular culture 
 "Something Wall-Mart This Way Comes" – a 2004 episode of Comedy Central's South Park
A Walmart Supercenter appeared in the 2021 film Ghostbusters: Afterlife, at a fictional Oklahoma town Summerville. It was filmed in a Walmart store (Store #3013) on location in Deerfoot City shopping center at Calgary, Canada.

See also

 Big-box store
 Lukas Walton
 Walmart greeter
 Wal-Mart First Tee Open at Pebble Beach – former name of a golf tournament
 Wal-Mart: The High Cost of Low Price – a 2005 documentary film by director Robert Greenwald
 Walmarting – a neologism
 Why Wal-Mart Works; and Why That Drives Some People C-R-A-Z-Y – a 2005 rebuttal to the Greenwald documentary

References

External links

 Walmart Inc. Corporate Site

 

 
1962 establishments in Arkansas
1970s initial public offerings
American companies established in 1962
Bentonville, Arkansas
Companies based in Arkansas
Companies in the Dow Jones Industrial Average
Companies listed on the New York Stock Exchange
Consumer electronics retailers in the United States
Discount stores of the United States
Garden centres
Hypermarkets of the United States
Multinational companies headquartered in the United States
Online retailers of the United States
Retail companies established in 1962
Supermarkets of China
Supermarkets of the United States
Superstores in the United States
Toy retailers of the United States
Walton family